Sangapi Airport  is an airport serving the village of Sangapi, between Jgapa and Atemble, in the Madang Province of Papua New Guinea.

Airlines and destinations

Airports in Papua New Guinea
Gulf Province